Infermental was a magazine published solely on videocassettes. The concept was conceived the Hungarian filmmaker Gábor Bódy in 1980. The name is a combination of the words "international", "ferment", and "experimental".

History
The eleven volumes of Infermental were published from 1980 to 1991 with a rotating series of editors from different countries. Each annual issue assembled from four to seven hours of the audio-visual work that represented the latest national trends of each country.

Infermental'''s ten issues (and one special) totaled approximately seventy hours of material from more than a thousand artists and thirty six countries. Among the numerous participating artists were Gary Hill, Rafael Montañez Ortiz, Jon Jost, Peter Weibel, Heiko Daxl, Marina Grzinic, Aina Smid, Joan Jonas, Yello, Ulrike Rosenbach, Hiroshi Ito, Mona Hatoum, Paul Garrin, and Steina and Woody Vasulka.

In 1990, Veruschka Bódy, who co-ordinated the project after Gábor Bódy's death in 1985, stated, "The annual anthologies, published by local editors (artist groups from 12 cities), are in fact a rich find for semoticians, topologists and visual philosophers. With this now 65 hours long video archive, a vocabulary of the 1980s has been made available to the public."

Availability
The Infermental'' collection is accessible to the public at the Center for Art and Media Karlsruhe.

References

External links
 
 "Infermental 5: The Image of Fiction"

1980 establishments in Hungary
1991 disestablishments in Hungary
Visual arts magazines
Defunct magazines published in Hungary
Magazines published in Hungary
Hungarian-language magazines
Magazines established in 1980
Magazines disestablished in 1991